Prosoplus javanicus is a species of beetle in the family Cerambycidae. It was described by Per Olof Christopher Aurivillius in 1916. It is known from Java.

References

Prosoplus
Beetles described in 1916